Brian Warsop (12 January 1904 – 18 March 1993) was an English cricketer.  Warsop was a right-handed batsman who bowled slow left-arm orthodox.  He was born at Willesden, Middlesex.

Warsop made his first-class debut for Essex in the 1931 County Championship against Northamptonshire.  He made four further first-class appearances for the county, all of which came in the 1932 County Championship, with the last coming against Leicestershire.  In his five appearances he scored 128 runs at an average of 16.00, with a high score of 51.  This score, which was his only first-class fifty, came against Warwickshire in 1932.

He died in Melbourne, Australia on 18 March 1993.

References

External links
Brian Warsop at ESPNcricinfo
Brian Warsop at CricketArchive

1904 births
1993 deaths
People from Willesden
English cricketers
Essex cricketers